The Lycoming GSO-580 is a family of eight-cylinder horizontally opposed, supercharged, carburetor-equipped aircraft engines for both airplanes and helicopters, manufactured by Lycoming Engines in the late 1950s and early 1960s.

The family includes the original GSO-580 fixed-wing aircraft engine series, as well as the later SO-580 and VSO-580 helicopter engines. There is no non-supercharged, non-geared version of the engine, which would have been designated O-580 and therefore the base model is the GSO-580.

Design and development
Compared to other horizontally opposed engines of similar displacement this family of engines produces high output power by supercharging and high maximum rpm, at the cost of higher weight.

The GSO-580 series was certified under Type Certificate 256, while the SO-580 and VSO-580 series were certified under type certificate 285. Both were manufactured under Production Certificate No. 3.

Variants
O-580-1Military variant similar to the GSO-580-D
GSO-580
Eight-cylinder, horizontally opposed, geared-drive, supercharged,  at 3300 rpm for take-off,  at 3000 rpm continuous, dry weight , Bendix PSH-9BDE carburetor. Minimum fuel grade 91/98 avgas. Designation indicates Geared, Supercharged, Opposed.
GSO-580-B
Eight-cylinder, horizontally opposed, geared-drive, supercharged,  at 3300 rpm for take-off,  at 3000 rpm continuous, dry weight , Bendix PSH-9BDE carburetor. Minimum fuel grade 100/130 avgas. Designation indicates Geared, Supercharged, Opposed.
GSO-580-C
Eight-cylinder, horizontally opposed, geared-drive, supercharged,  at 3300 rpm for take-off,  at 3000 rpm continuous, dry weight , Bendix PS-9BDE carburetor. Minimum fuel grade 91/98 avgas. Designation indicates Geared, Supercharged, Opposed.
GSO-580-D
Eight-cylinder, horizontally opposed, geared-drive, supercharged,  at 3300 rpm for take-off,  at 3000 rpm continuous, dry weight , Bendix PS-9BDE carburetor. Minimum fuel grade 100/130 avgas. Designation indicates Geared, Supercharged, Opposed.
SO-580-A1A
Eight-cylinder, horizontally opposed, geared-drive, supercharged,  at 3300 rpm for take-off,  at 3000 rpm continuous, dry weight , Bendix PS-9BDE carburetor. Minimum fuel grade 100/130 avgas. Designation indicates Supercharged, Opposed. Designed for horizontal or up to 35 degrees nose-up helicopter installation.
SO-580-A1B
Eight-cylinder, horizontally opposed, geared-drive, supercharged,  at 3300 rpm for take-off,  at 3000 rpm continuous, dry weight , Bendix PS-9BDE carburetor. Minimum fuel grade 100/130 avgas. Designation indicates Supercharged, Opposed. Designed for horizontal or up to 35 degrees nose-up helicopter installation.
VSO-580-A1A
Eight-cylinder, horizontally opposed, geared-drive, supercharged,  at 3300 rpm for take-off,  at 3000 rpm continuous, dry weight , Bendix PS-9BDE carburetor. Minimum fuel grade 100/130 avgas. Designation indicates Vertical-mounted, Supercharged, Opposed. Designed for vertical helicopter installation.

Applications
GSO-580
Beechcraft Model 34
Cessna 308
Fairchild XNQ
SO-580
Doman LZ-5

Specifications (VSO-580-A1A)

See also

References

GSO-580
1950s aircraft piston engines